Momu is an electronic music producer duo of John David Moyer (of Jondi & Spesh fame) and Mark Musselman. The pair began making music together after meeting at Qoöl, a party organized by Moyer. 

They have released records on labels such as Loöq Records and Bedrock Breaks.  Additionally, they have had singles featured in the Global Underground series.

They are one of the foremost DJ teams of breaks music in the United States. They mainly operate in San Francisco.  Momu has also appeared as a special guest DJ on programs such as John Digweed's Kiss 100 show and also special guests on Proton Radio.

References

External links
 
Momu Official Website
Momu on Myspace
Qool San Francisco Info
Interview with Progressive-Sounds

American electronic music groups